There are several rivers named São Pedro River.

Brazil
 São Pedro River (Alonzo River), a river of Paraná state in southern Brazil
 São Pedro River (Guandu River), a river of Rio de Janeiro state in southeastern Brazil
 São Pedro River (Macaé River), a river of Rio de Janeiro state in southeastern Brazil
 São Pedro River (Minas Gerais), a river of Minas Gerais state in southeastern Brazil
 São Pedro River (Pernambuco)
 São Pedro River (Santa Catarina), a river of Santa Catarina state in southeastern Brazil

See also
 São Pedro (disambiguation)